The 1996–97 Segunda Divisão de Honra season was the seventh season of the competition and the 63rd season of recognised second-tier football in Portugal.

Overview
The league was contested by 18 teams with SC Campomaiorense winning the championship and gaining promotion to the Primeira Liga along with Varzim SC and Académica Coimbra. At the other end of the table SC Covilhã, CD Beja and FC Tirsense were relegated to the Segunda Divisão.

League standings

Footnotes

External links
 Portugal 1996/97 - RSSSF (Jorge Santos, Jan Schoenmakers and Daniel Dalence)
 Portuguese II Liga 1996/1997 - footballzz.co.uk

Portuguese Second Division seasons
Port
2